Campanula bononiensis is a species of flowering plant belonging to the family Campanulaceae.

Its native range is France to Kazakhstan.

References

bononiensis